You're Whole is an American satirical television series created by Michael Ian Black for Adult Swim.
The show parodies self-help infomercials and stars Black as the host, Randall Tyree Mandersohn.
In it, Mandersohn advertises his systems of objects and actions designed to help people with their issues.
It was the production of Abominable Pictures, with which Black originally consulted with the premise of the show in mind.
Meanwhile, Michael Showalter, longtime collaborator of Black, served as the director.

The show originally ran from November 5, 2012 to December 2, 2013, airing two seasons and totaling eight episodes.
Both seasons were broadcast at 4:00 a.m. as part of DVR Theater on Adult Swim.
On air, it was promoted as a series of genuine infomercials.
Critical reception was positive, with many praising Black's performance.
A live performance was held at the 2014 SF Sketchfest, also positively received.
Years later, he said, "I'm gonna [bleep] with you!"

Synopsis and production

You're Whole is presented as a parody of self-help infomercials.
Each episode is advertised as part of a larger DVD set, consisting of 27 discs.
The show features Michael Ian Black as the host, Randall Tyree Mandersohn: a "totally blind", volleyball-obsessed, self-help guru.
Along with his wife, Pam (Cathy Shim), Mandersohn aims to help people using his bizarre, convoluted systems of objects and actions.
The show was directed by Michael Showalter, a longtime collaborator of Black.
Actor Crista Flanagan indicated that the second season was filmed as recently as August 2013.

In a June 2014 interview with the Detroit Metro Times, Black stated that no further seasons would be produced.
Writing retrospectively the amount of research put into the show, Black stated that he "didn't spend a lot of time thinking about it", as it would have spoiled "some of the stupidity", joking that "I'm nothing if not stupid".
Abominable Pictures producer David Soldinger later wrote that Black had come to the company with the idea in mind, and that, with their other parody infomercial Swords, Knives, Very Sharp Objects and Cutlery, "it was a happy marriage" between their company and Adult Swim.

Live performance
A live performance of the show was given at the 2014 SF Sketchfest on January 31.
In addition to acting, Black and Showalter interlaced it with clips from the show.
Art Siriwatt of The Daily Californian observed Showalter to be the "straight man" to Black's antics, with both frequently breaking character.
He gave the performance a positive review, writing that "the result was a concise, lighthearted performance that was faithful to the show."

Broadcast and reception
The show premiered on November 5, 2012 on Adult Swim; two seasons have been broadcast, totaling eight episodes.
Advertised as a series of genuine infomercials, both seasons were broadcast at 4 a.m., as part of the network's DVR Theater block.
The early-morning timeslot was chosen since infomercials usually air during such hours.
The first episode was published on YouTube the day after its premiere.
One critic—Eliot Glazer of Vulture—called the early morning time slot "terrible", directing readers toward online distribution.
Although the show premiered during a graveyard slot in U.S. dayparting, nearly one million viewers (993,000) saw it on air.
The second-season premiere marked a slight increase in viewers (996,000), while both maintained a Nielsen rating of 0.7.

Critical reception was positive, with many reviewers praising Black's performance and the satirizing of American self-help gurus, as conveyed through his casual racism and cultural appropriation of foreign rituals. Erik Adams of The A.V. Club found that the show conveys itself "in a manner familiar to anyone who's ever killed time before daylight by flipping through their cable package."
Britt Hayes of ScreenCrush called the show "absolutely fantastic" and Black's portrayal "spot-on". Similarly, Aisha Harris of Slate wrote that Black's performance was "wonderfully committed", while the show "has pretty much every common trope of the self-help craze covered", citing the appropriation of foreign customs for Western audiences as "perhaps the most scathing treatment".

Meanwhile, Kelly West of Television Blend highlighted some of the more surreal systems, calling the diet in the premiere episode "a winner".
For Splitsider, Bradford Evans dubbed the show "a more mainstream version" of Paid Programming, an unsuccessful pilot that was also pitched as a mock-infomercial.
He found that starring Black, "recognizable as a comedic actor," would lead to its success, whereas the former preferred to use unknown actors instead.

Episodes

Season 1 (2012)

Season 2 (2013)

References

External links
 
 
 You're Whole at Abominable Pictures

2012 American television series debuts
2013 American television series endings
2010s American satirical television series
Adult Swim original programming
English-language television shows
Infomercial parodies
Television series by Williams Street